The 1992–93 Iowa Hawkeyes men's basketball team represented the University of Iowa as members of the Big Ten Conference. The team was led by seventh-year head coach Tom Davis and played their home games at Carver-Hawkeye Arena. They ended the season 23–9 overall and 11–7 in Big Ten play to finish tied for third place. The Hawkeyes received an at-large bid to the NCAA tournament as #4 seed in the Southeast Region. After defeating Northeast Louisiana 82-69 in the first round, the Hawkeyes lost to Wake Forest 84-78 in the Round of 32.

Roster

Schedule/results

|-
!colspan=8| Non-conference regular season
|-

|-
!colspan=8| Big Ten Regular Season
|-

|-
!colspan=8| NCAA tournament

Rankings

^Coaches did not release a Week 1 poll.
*AP does not release post-NCAA Tournament rankings

Team players in the 1993 NBA draft

References

Iowa Hawkeyes
Iowa
Iowa Hawkeyes men's basketball seasons
Hawk
Hawk